Gilbert Padilla (born December 1927) is an American labor leader and civil rights activist who, along with Cesar Chavez and Dolores Huerta, co-founded the National Farm Workers Association (NWFA), which later became the United Farm Workers of America (UFW). In his position as Chavez's right-hand man, he served as vice president of the NWFA and then secretary-treasurer in the UFW. He helped to build the UFW through organizing union membership drives, boycotts, and strikes. In 1965, Padilla was the center of the rent strike in Tulare County. He and Jim Drake challenged the California state government for a sudden rent hike in labor camps where the buildings were long past their demolition date; it helped garner attention for the grape strike later in the year.

Early life 
Padilla was born in Los Banos, California. His parents had moved there only two years prior. The family lived in a labor camp called San Juan Camp and, consequently, Padilla spent his early years watching his parents work in the fields. During World War II, Padilla and his brothers enlisted in the army, where he served with the U.S. Army, 1st Cavalry Division in Japan.

Activism 
After returning home from the war in the 1940s, Padilla returned home to Los Banos to find that employment opportunities were scarce due to the presence of Mexican braceros in the fields. He found that the foreman of the fields was offering a lower wages than what the braceros received. Incensed, he left.

In 1955, he met Cesar Chavez and thus began a decades-long partnership. Living in Hanford, California and working part-time as a dry cleaner and onion gleaner, Padilla was at first uninterested in joining the Community Service Organization (CSO), thinking that it was nothing more than a "social club" with temporary goals. A meeting with Chavez and the President of the Hanford Community Services Organization and war veteran who received the Purple Heart for meritorious achievement and the Bronze Star for saving his platoon under enemy fire, Peter B Garcia, (Larry McSwain,1957) occurred through the night that included the discussion of the improvement of farm worker conditions, which helped Padilla to change his mind. The CSO was primarily focused on voter registration and while it did have housing and education committees, there was no specific group that addressed the plight of farm workers. Chavez worked to establish such a committee in the CSO by establishing CSO chapters in rural communities where the farm workers made up a large portion of the population; Padilla himself was sent to Stockton, where he grabbed a hold of a grant that allowed him to study housing conditions of the local farm workers. However, at the next CSO convention in 1962, Chavez's farm worker committee proposal was shot down, leading him to resign from his director position and thus, his salary to support his family.  Padilla, who also relied on a CSO wages to support his family, was scared by Chavez's obstinacy. Nonetheless, he followed Chavez to resign and they establish their own organization by visiting all the rural CSO chapters to prepare them for Chavez's new pursuit.

In September 1962, the NWFA was created and initially set up based on CSO administrative structures with Chavez as President and Padilla as vice president. Padilla ended up finding a new source of funding via Fred Ross and the IAF. In January 1965, Padilla was hired by the Reverend Jim Drake to work with the Migrant Ministry in Porterville. By May, Drake and Padilla were organizing farm worker families living in the area's Woodville and Linnell labor camps in a rent strike. The workers were living in shabby tin houses, freezing in winter and sweltering in summer, that were meant to be torn down by 1947, but the California state government paid no attention to this and continued to charge monthly rent without trying to update the conditions. The strike succeeded and the government agreed to construct better buildings on the same property for the farm workers.

In August 1965, the first grape strike was held at Rancho Blanco, which was not too far from Porterville. Many of those who had participated in the rent strike came to support the new effort, including Drake, farm workers, LeRoy Chatfield, and young college students that Padilla had gotten to know. To bring more attention to the situation, Padilla went against Drake's advice to publish the strike in the local Fresno Bee. Chavez, who was hospitalized, did not participate and later berated Padilla for deliberately waiting until he was sick to take action.

In the following years, Padilla willingly uprooted his family to move from place to place. In December 1965, he went to Los Angeles to set up the Schenley boycott; in 1966 he worked on the election in El Paso, Texas where the NWFA won an election for the first time.

Meanwhile, the Agricultural Workers Organizing Committee (AWOC), a Filipino farm worker organization, clashed with the NWFA, whose farm laborer goals were seen as intruding upon their territory. Chavez and Padilla worked out the details with Larry Itliong to merge the groups for mutual benefit. In 1973, Padilla was elected secretary-treasurer of the newly-formed UFW.

However, Chavez became increasingly paranoid and controlling and began to purge the union of those who he felt were Communists or secretly plotted against him. One by one, key members from the early days began leaving and destabilizing the core group. Padilla himself left in 1980, disappointed that his loyalty was being questioned.

Personal life 
Padilla married twice. His second wife, Esther Padilla, was highly involved in his labor organization activities and for a time, worked the fields with her eldest step-son to support Padilla. Padilla currently resides in Fresno, California and leads an active life with his family and circle of friends. Former huelgistas and friends visit and stay in touch with him regularly.

References 

1927 births
Living people
American trade union leaders
American civil rights activists
United Farm Workers people
American trade unionists of Mexican descent
Trade unionists from California
American activists of Mexican descent
McSwain,L.1957. " 'For outstanding service...' " Pete Garcia Wins Award... THE HANFORD SENTINNEL, 179,18.